Wriothesley (pronounced  RYE-uths-lee) may refer to:

William Wriothesley (died 1513), officer of arms at the College of Arms in London
Thomas Wriothesley (died 1534), long-serving officer of arms at the College of Arms in London
Thomas Wriothesley, 1st Earl of Southampton KG (1505–1550), English politician of the Tudor period
Charles Wriothesley (1508–1562), long-serving officer of arms at the College of Arms in London
Henry Wriothesley, 2nd Earl of Southampton (1545–1581), English noble
Mary Wriothesley, Countess of Southampton (1552–1607), English countess
Elizabeth Wriothesley, Countess of Southampton (1572–1655), chief lady-in-waiting to Elizabeth I of England
Henry Wriothesley, 3rd Earl of Southampton (1573–1624), English noble
Thomas Wriothesley, 4th Earl of Southampton KG (1607–1667), 17th-century English statesman, and supporter of Charles II
Rachel Wriothesley, Lady Russell (1636–1723), English noblewoman, heiress, and author
Baptist Wriothesley Noel (1799–1873), English evangelical clergyman of aristocratic family

See also
Wriothesley Noel, 2nd Earl of Gainsborough (died 1690), English peer and Member of Parliament
Wriothesley Russell, 2nd Duke of Bedford KG (1680–1711), the son of William Russell, Lord Russell and his wife Lady Rachel Wriothesley
Wriothesley Russell, 3rd Duke of Bedford (1708–1732), the son of Wriothesley Russell, 2nd Duke of Bedford

References